Sharon Ambrose (September 3, 1939 — April 3, 2017) was an American politician and teacher from Washington, D.C. who served as a member of the Council of the District of Columbia from 1997 to 2007, representing Ward 6 as a Democrat.

Early life and education
Ambrose was born in Chicago, Illinois on September 3, 1939. She graduated from Saint Xavier University.

Career
Ambrose served on the Council of the District of Columbia from 1997 to 2007, representing Ward 6 as a Democrat. She retired after two terms to focus on an illness, which had been misdiagnosed as multiple sclerosis.

Following her retirement, Ambrose helped with the mayoral campaign of David Catania, as well as the campaign for an at-large council seat by David Grosso, a former staff person.

Personal life and death
Ambrose was married and had four children. She died on April 4, 2017 at George Washington University Hospital in Washington, D.C. at the age of 77.

References

External links
Sharon Ambrose in The Washington Post voter guide

1939 births
2017 deaths
20th-century American women politicians
21st-century American women politicians
Washington, D.C., Democrats
Women city councillors in the District of Columbia
Politicians from Chicago
Schoolteachers from Washington, D.C.
Xavier University alumni